Fertility while breastfeeding is controlled by the hormonal effects induced by breastfeeding during the postpartum period. Hormones associated with lactation and breastfeeding can inhibit processes necessary for conception. Because of the high variation of this process, breastfeeding is not recommended to be a method of contraception by medical providers, although correct use of breastfeeding as contraception, termed Lactational Amenorrhea Method (LAM), is as effective as hormonal contraceptive pills for the first six months after birth.

Reliability 
Breastfeeding as contraception - the lactational amenorrhea method - has a failure rate of 2% with typical use, and 0.5% with perfect use. By comparison, condoms have a failure rate of 13% with typical use, and 2% with perfect use. Breastfeeding does not provide protection against STIs. Breastfeeding is not a sole method of postpartum contraception that is recommended by medical providers, because its effectiveness is variable. LAM is comparable in effectiveness to oral contraception. LAM is as effective as progesterone-only contraceptives when comparing perfect use, and much more effective than oral contraception with typical use.
The factors that contribute to the reliability of using breastfeeding as a method of postpartum contraception are the amount and frequency of breastfeeding, the age of the baby, and whether they baby is exclusively breastfed or is partially formula fed or has started solids. To be effective, LAM requires the baby be less than six months old, exclusively breastfed, at least every four hours during the day and at least every six hours during the night.

The time in which a lactating woman does not menstruate is called lactational amenorrhea. Amenorrhea is the medical term that means “no menstruation.” If a woman is not menstruating, her uterine lining is not proliferating and shedding. The purpose of uterine lining proliferation is to provide a favorable environment for a potential fertilized zygote. A thick uterine lining is rich in grooves and blood vessels. The grooves increase the surface area inside the uterus, giving the fertilized zygote many different options for locations to implant. Blood vessels provide the implanted zygote with the sufficient amount of nutrients necessary for its development. Without uterine proliferation, implantation is extremely rare. The length of time in which a postpartum woman does not ovulate is another factor. During ovulation, an egg develops, leaves the ovary, and travels down the fallopian tube. There, it will most likely get fertilized if sperm cells are present. If ovulation does not occur, there is no egg present to be fertilized and become a developing zygote.
Hormones present during breastfeeding can inhibit ovulation and uterine proliferation. The level of inhibition is highly variable in potency and is not uniform from woman to woman. Time since delivery contributes to the fertility of a postpartum woman as well. There is a direct relationship between time and fertility. As time increases, fertility also increases. This time can vary between individuals. This is why medical providers do not recommend using breastfeeding as a primary method for contraception. Other contraceptive use contributes to postpartum fertility as well. Medical providers will often recommend that sexually active postpartum woman be on some form contraceptive to avoid a subsequent pregnancy if desired.

Physiology 
During pregnancy, levels of estrogen and progesterone are high and stimulate the production of dopamine. Dopamine inhibits the production of prolactin. Because of this, prolactin is not produced during pregnancy. After childbirth, levels of estrogen and progesterone plummet, no longer stimulating the production of dopamine. Without dopamine present, prolactin's production is no longer inhibited. Both prolactin and oxytocin are needed for breastfeeding to occur. Oxytocin secretion is stimulated by suckling. Suckling sends sensory input to the central nervous system where higher brain centers block dopamine and release oxytocin. The presence of oxytocin triggers the secretion of prolactin. Prolactin regulates the production of milk and delivery of that milk into the alveoli of breast tissue where it waits to be excreted. Oxytocin regulates the excretion of milk by targeting the layer of smooth muscle cells that surround the alveoli, causing them to contract. As this muscle contracts, milk is forced out of the alveoli, through ducts, and out of the breast via the nipple. The prolactin that is being secreted during one round of feeding is making milk for the next round of feeding. Oxytocin is expelling milk that was made during the last feeding. A breastfeeding mother's fertility is decreased because higher amounts of prolactin inhibit GnRH through a direct relationship. The less prolactin there is secreted, the less inhibition occurs. Inhibition and fertility have an inverse relationship. The less inhibition that occurs, the higher the fertility rate will be. If there are fewer suckling events, there will be less prolactin production. If suckling ceases, prolactin levels will return to those of a non-pregnant woman.

Importance 
If breastfeeding did not have any effect on fertility, then newly postpartum women would have an increased likelihood of getting pregnant. If they were to become pregnant again within the period of time in which they are breastfeeding their newborn, their next pregnancy would inhibit the production of milk as explained above. Breastfeeding's inhibitory actions reduce the likelihood of a subsequent pregnancy.

References 

Chao, S. "The Effect of Lactation on Ovulation and Fertility." Clinics in Perinatology. U.S. National Library of Medicine, Mar. 1987. Web. 21 Nov. 2019

McGregor, James A. "Lactation and Contraception." SpringerLink. Springer, Boston, MA, 01 Jan. 1983. Web. 21 Nov. 2019.

Planned Parenthood. "Breastfeeding as Birth Control: Information About LAM." Planned Parenthood. N.p., n.d. Web. 21 Nov. 2019.

Shaaban, Mamdouh M. "Contraception with Progestogens and Progesterone during Lactation." The Journal of Steroid Biochemistry and Molecular Biology. Pergamon, 17 Jan. 2003. Web. 21 Nov. 2019.

Breastfeeding